2nd Kentucky Cavalry Regiment may refer to one of two opposing regiments in the American Civil War:

 2nd Kentucky Cavalry Regiment (CSA)
 2nd Kentucky Cavalry Regiment (Union)